Diclybothriidae is a family of monogeneans in the order Diclybothriidea.

Genera
Diclybothrium Leuckart, 1835
Paradiclybothrium Bychowski & Gusev, 1950

References

Polyopisthocotylea
Platyhelminthes families